Jörundur Garðar Hilmarsson (15 March 1946 – 13 August 1992), was an Icelandic linguist, scholar and grammarian specializing in comparative grammar of Indo-European languages.

He finished his doctoral thesis, Studies in Tocharian Phonology, Morphology and Etymology with special emphasis on the o-vocalism at the Leiden University. He gave great importance to the study of Tocharian languages, authoring a detailed etymological dictionary for the language.

Jörundur also established the international scholarly journal Tocharian and Indo-European Studies (TIES) in 1987 and continued to head its editorial staff from Reykjavík until his premature death in 1992 at the age of 46.

Upon his death, Tocharian and Indo-European Studies moved from Reykjavík to Copenhagen,  with the Danish professor of Indo-European languages Jens Elmegård Rasmussen as the new executive editor. Upon Jörundur's death, the journal published most of his work in 1996 under the title: "Materials for a Tocharian Historical and Etymological Dictionary".

Balticists
Linguists of Indo-European languages
Linguists
1946 births
1992 deaths